Mick Nanyn (born 3 June 1982) is a former Scotland international rugby league footballer. He set point scoring records at several of the clubs he played for. Nanyn started his career at Swinton, and went on to play for the Rochdale Hornets, Whitehaven, Widnes, Oldham 
(Heritage № 1225) and the Leigh Centurions. He also played for Scotland at international level.

Background
Nanyn was born in Wigan, Greater Manchester, England.

Club career
Nanyn had a reputation as a journeyman, playing for the Widnes Vikings, Whitehaven, the Rochdale Hornets and the Swinton Lions.

Starting out at Swinton Lions in 1999, Nanyn made his debut at the age of 16. Despite his age, Nanyn was a standout performer for the Lions during the more turbulent years of 1999-2003. Thus defining himself as both a try scorer and prolific goal kicker. Nanyn signed for the Widnes Vikings in 2006. In his first season at the club, he scored 388 points, breaking the record for most points scored in a single season, an accolade he took from Jonathan Davies. He beat his own record a year later, scoring 434 points in 2007.

In 2008 he beat Pat Rich's seven-year-old record at Oldham for points in a season (362, 139 goals, 21 tries).

He joined Super League side the Harlequins RL for the 2009 season. He only managed a couple of appearances in trial games for the Harlequins RL.

Representative honours
In 2001, Nanyn represented the Northern Ford Premiership in an Under-21 trial game against the Super League, scoring a try in a surprise 27–20 win.

Nanyn was named in the Scotland training squad for the 2008 Rugby League World Cup.

Nanyn won ten caps for Scotland, including one appearance as a substitute. In 2009, he scored 40 points (two tries and 16 goals) in a 104–0 victory over Italy.

Career records
As of 2015, with 3714-points he is sixth on British rugby league's "most points in a career" record list behind Neil Fox, Jim Sullivan, Kevin Sinfield, Gus Risman and John Woods.

Genealogical information
Mick Nanyn is the son of the rugby league  who played in the 1970s and 1980s for Wigan and Springfield Borough; Michael "Mick" Nanyn.

References

External links
(archived by web.archive.org) Oldham Profile
Harlequins RL sign Mick Nanyn

1982 births
Living people
English people of Scottish descent
English rugby league players
Halifax R.L.F.C. players
Leigh Leopards players
London Broncos players
Oldham R.L.F.C. players
Rochdale Hornets players
Rugby league centres
Rugby league players from Wigan
Scotland national rugby league team players
Swinton Lions players
Whitehaven R.L.F.C. players
Widnes Vikings players